Michael Courtney Jenkins Putnam (born September 20, 1933) is an American classicist specializing in Latin literature, but has also studied literature written in many other languages. Putnam has been particularly influential in his publications concerning Virgil‘s ‘’Aeneid‘’. He is the son of politician and businessman Roger Putnam. Putnam received his B.A., M.A., and Ph. D. from Harvard. After receiving his Ph.D. in 1959 he taught at Smith College for a year. He then moved on to teach at Brown University and serving as W. Duncan MacMillan II Professor of Classics and a professor of comparative literature for 48 years before retiring in 2008.  He was awarded the 1963 Rome Prize,and was later a Resident (1970) and Mellon Professor in Charge of the Classical School (1989-91). He was elected to the American Academy of Arts and Sciences in 1996 and the American Philosophical Society in 1998.

He served as sole trustee of Lowell Observatory from 1967 to 1987. Asteroid 2557 Putnam was named in his and his father’s honor. The official  was published by the Minor Planet Center on 8 April 1982.

Publications
In addition to the countless articles and reviews Michael C. J. Putnam has written, he has written many books.
 The Poetry of the Aeneid (1965)
 Virgil’s Pastoral Art: Studies in the Eclogues (1970)
 Tibullus: A Commentary (1973)
 Virgil’s Poem of the Earth (1979)
 Essays on Latin Lyric, Elegy, and Epic (1982)
 Artifices of Eternity: Horace’s Fourth Book of Odes (1986)
 Virgil’s Aeneid: Interpretation and Influence (1995)
 Virgil’s Epic Designs: Ekphrasis in the Aeneid (1998)
 Horace’s ‘’Carmen Saeculare’': Ritual Magic and the Poet’s Art (2000) 
 The Humanness of Heroes: Studies in the Conclusion of Virgil’s Aeneid (2011)

He has also recently translated and edited Maffeo Vegio: Short Epics (2004); Poetic Interplay: Catullus and Horace (2006).

References

External links 
 Brown University Profile

1933 births
Living people
Writers from Springfield, Massachusetts
American classical scholars
Harvard University alumni
Smith College faculty
Classical scholars of Brown University
Scholars of Latin literature
Members of the American Philosophical Society